Joe Goddard (25 November 1857 – 21 January 1903) was an Australian boxer known for his great strength, durability, and punching power.  He stood 6' 0" (185 cm) and weighed 12 stone 12 lbs to 14 stone 4 lbs (180–200 pounds, 82–91 kg).

He was one of the first reported Heavyweight Champions of Australia.  Among the men he defeated were Joe Choynski, Peter Maher, and "Denver" Ed Smith.  His (incomplete) record comes out to: 28 wins (22 by knockout), 12 losses, 8 draws, and 6 no decisions.

Goddard was shot in the head by a police constable whom he had attacked with a baseball bat during a fight at the Republican primaries in Pennsauken Township, Philadelphia, New Jersey in July 1902. After spending two months in hospital he recovered sufficiently to be released with the bullet still in his head, only to be arrested for having assaulted the constable and imprisoned when unable to put up $1,000 bail. He was said to have lost his sanity a few days later and transferred to Blackwood Insane Asylum, residing there until December, when he was taken to Cooper Hospital, where he died on 21 January 1903. His body was donated to the Philadelphia Medical College for scientific research.

Goddard was the 2006 Inductee for the Australian National Boxing Hall of Fame Pioneers category.

Professional boxing record

References

External links
 

1857 births
1903 deaths
Heavyweight boxers
Australian male boxers